Mæland is a Norwegian surname. Notable people with the surname include:

Eirik Mæland (born 1989), Norwegian footballer
Monica Mæland (born 1968), Norwegian politician
Øystein Mæland (born 1960), Norwegian psychiatrist, civil servant and politician

Norwegian-language surnames